Philip Owen may refer to:

Philip Owen (1933–2021), mayor of Vancouver, British Columbia, 1993–2003
Philip Wynn Owen, CB, Director General of Work and Pensions of the Department for Work and Pensions (UK) in 2008 New Year Honours
Philip Owen (mystery writer) (1903–1989), or Philip Owen (pen name), American mystery writer

See also
Philip Owens, English poet and novelist of the 1920s and 1930s